The Ugly River is a river of the West Coast Region of New Zealand's South Island. It flows south to reach the Karamea River 17 kilometres northeast of Karamea. The river's entire length is within Kahurangi National Park

See also
List of rivers of New Zealand

References

Rivers of the West Coast, New Zealand
Buller District
Kahurangi National Park
Rivers of New Zealand